State Road 620 (SR 620) is a  state highway in Polk County, Florida, that runs from SR 540 just south of Winter Haven city limits to SR 655 and Avenue O Southwest in southwestern Winter Haven. The route is only signed for the first , after which it is unsigned for its concurrency with SR 655.

Major intersections

References

External links

FDOT Map of Polk County (Including SR 620)

620
620
Winter Haven, Florida
State highways in the United States shorter than one mile